The National Basketball League Most Improved Player is an annual National Basketball League (NBL) award given since the 1988 NBL season. The award is designed to honour an up-and-coming player who has made a dramatic improvement from the previous season or seasons. At the season's end, each club nominates one player for the award with the head coach, one assistant coach and the team captain then voting in a 3-2-1 format (3 votes being indicative of the most deserving). Voters are not allowed to vote for players from their own team.

Winners 

|}

References

Most Improved Player
Awards established in 1988
Most improved awards